Maui County, officially the County of Maui, is a county in the U.S. state of Hawaii. It consists of the islands of Maui, Lānai, Molokai (except for a portion of Molokai that comprises Kalawao County), Kahoolawe, and Molokini. The latter two are uninhabited. As of the 2020 census, the population was 164,754. The county seat is Wailuku.

Maui County is included in the Kahului-Wailuku-Lahaina, HI Metropolitan Statistical Area.

Government

Maui County has a quasi-mayor-council form of municipal government. Unlike traditional municipal governments, the county government is established by the state legislature by statute and is not chartered. Executive authority is vested in the mayor, elected by the voters on a nonpartisan basis to a four-year term (with a limit of two consecutive full terms). Legislative authority is vested in the nine-member county council. All seats in the county council have residency requirements, but all Maui County voters may vote in elections for all nine seats regardless of residence. Members of the county council are elected on a nonpartisan basis to two-year terms (with a limit of five consecutive full terms).

The mayor of Maui County is Richard Bissen, serving since January 2023. Richard Bissen formerly served as a Judge for the 2nd Hawaii State Circuit Court.

The county's Department of Liquor Control regulates and enforces state and county laws regarding the manufacture, importation, sale and consumption of intoxicating liquors.

The parade banner of the county, described simply as "parade banner of the County of Maui", this banner is vertically divided light blue-light green-light blue, by red stripes, with a seal in the center.

Geography

The islands that comprise Maui County correspond to the remnants of the ancient landmass of Maui Nui. Haleakalā is a shield volcano located on the eastern side of the island of Maui.

Adjacent counties
Hawaii County, Hawaii - southeast
Kalawao County, Hawaii - north
Honolulu County, Hawaii - northwest

National protected areas
 Haleakalā National Park
 Kakahaia National Wildlife Refuge
 Kealia Pond National Wildlife Refuge
 Kalaupapa National Historical Park

Demographics

As of the 2000 Census, there were 128,094 people, 43,507 households, and 29,889 families residing in the county. The population density was 110 people per square mile (43/km2). There were 56,377 housing units at an average density of 49 per square mile (19/km2). The racial makeup of the county was 33.01% Asian, 28.90% White, 22.24% from two or more races, 10.72% Pacific Islander, 1.40% Black or African American, 0.37% Native American and 1.36% from other races. 7.8% of the population were Hispanic or Latino of any race.

There were 43,507 households, out of which 33.00% had children under the age of 18 living with them, 50.90% were married couples living together, 12.00% had a female householder with no husband present, and 31.30% were non-families. 21.90% of all households were made up of individuals, and 6.30% had someone living alone who was 65 years of age or older. The average household size was 2.91 and the average family size was 3.41.

In the county, the population was spread out, with 25.50% under the age of 18, 7.70% from 18 to 24, 30.90% from 25 to 44, 24.40% from 45 to 64, and 11.40% who were 65 years of age or older. The median age was 37 years. For every 100 females, there were 100.90 males. For every 100 females age 18 and over, there were 100.20 males.

2020 religion census

Maui County is among the most religiously diverse counties in the US. A 2020 census by the Public Religion Research Institute (unconnected to the official US census) calculates a religious diversity score of 0.867 for Maui County, where a score of 1 represents complete diversity (each religious group of equal size), and 0 being a total lack of diversity. Only eight counties in the US have higher diversity scores than Maui County, four of which are boroughs of New York City.

Economy

Top employers
According to the county's 2018 Comprehensive Annual Financial Report, the top employers in the county are:

Transportation

Airports
Three airports provide air service to the island of Maui:
 Hana Airport provides regional service to eastern Maui
 Kahului Airport in central Maui is the island's busiest airport
 Kapalua Airport provides regional service to western Maui

There are also airports on Maui's smaller adjacent islands:
Lānai Airport provides regional service to Lānai
Molokai Airport provides regional service to Molokai

Major highways

Communities

Census-designated places

 Haiku-Pauwela
 Haliimaile
 Hana
 Kaanapali
 Kahului
 Kapalua
 Kaunakakai
 Keokea
 Kihei
 Kualapuu
 Kula
 Lahaina
 Lanai City
 Launiupoko
 Maalaea
 Mahinahina
 Makawao
 Makena
 Manele
 Maunaloa
 Napili-Honokowai
Olinda
 Olowalu
 Paia
 Pukalani
 Ualapue
 Waihee-Waiehu
 Waikapu
 Wailea
 Wailuku

Unincorporated communities
Haiku
Kaumalapau
Keanae
Kīpahulu
Napili
Olinda
Puunēnē
Spreckelsville
Waihee
Wailua

Former communities
Waikola

Politics

Maui County was the only county in the United States won by Dennis Kucinich during his unsuccessful campaign for the Democratic Party nomination to the presidency in 2004.

Education
Hawaii Department of Education operates public schools in Maui County.

Sister cities
Maui County's sister cities are:

 American Samoa
 Arequipa, Peru
 Bacarra, Philippines
 Badoc, Philippines
 Cabugao, Philippines
 Easter Island, Chile
 Embo, Scotland, United Kingdom
 Fukuyama, Japan
 Funchal, Portugal
 Goyang, South Korea
 Hachijō, Japan

 Manila, Philippines
 Pingtung, Taiwan
 Puerto Princesa, Philippines
 Quezon City, Philippines
 Saipan, Northern Mariana Islands
 San Juan, Philippines
 Santa, Philippines
 Sanya, China
 São Miguel Island, Portugal
 Sarrat, Philippines
 Zambales, Philippines

See also
 Maui
 Kula
 Vic-Maui Yacht Race

References

External links
 
 
 

 
Hawaii counties
1905 establishments in Hawaii
Populated places established in 1905